The Sanjak of Çanad was a sanjak (district) of the Ottoman Empire located in what is today northwestern Banat (northernmost Serbia, southernmost Hungary and northwesternmost Romania), centered at Cenad (in modern Romania).

The Eastern Hungarian Kingdom, a vassal state of the Ottoman Empire in the first half of the 16th century, lost the territory during the Ottoman campaign in 1551-1552, when it was incorporated into the newly formed Temeşvar Eyalet. It was one of four sanjaks of the Temeşvar Eyalet during the 1550s, one of eleven sanjaks in 1699, one of five in 1700–01, one of six in 1701–02, until its abolishment in 1707, becoming a sub-district of the Sanjak of Temeşvar. It was conquered by the Habsburgs and organized into the Csanád County.

See also
 Csanád County (medieval)

References

Sources

 
 

Sanjaks of the Ottoman Empire in Europe
States and territories established in the 16th century
1716 disestablishments in Europe
History of Banat